A waterbed, water mattress, or flotation mattress is a bed or mattress filled with water. Waterbeds intended for medical therapies appear in various reports through the 19th century. The modern version, invented in San Francisco and patented in 1971, became a popular consumer item in the United States through the 1980s with up to 20% of the market in 1986 and 22% in 1987. By 2013, they accounted for less than 5% of new bed sales.

Construction

Waterbeds primarily consist of two types, hard-sided beds and soft-sided beds.

A hard-sided waterbed consists of a water-containing mattress inside a rectangular frame of wood resting on a plywood deck that sits on a platform.

A soft-sided waterbed consists of a water-containing mattress inside of a rectangular frame of sturdy foam, zippered inside a fabric casing, which sits on a platform. It looks like a conventional bed and is designed to fit existing bedroom furniture. The platform usually looks like a conventional foundation or box spring, and sits atop a reinforced metal frame.

Early waterbed mattresses, and many inexpensive modern mattresses, have a single water chamber. When the water mass in these "free flow" mattresses is disturbed, significant wave motion can be felt, and they need time to stabilize after a disturbance. Later models employed wave-reducing methods, including fiber batting. Some models only partially reduce wave motion, while more expensive models almost eliminate wave motion.

Water beds are normally heated. If no heater is used, the water will equalize with the room air temperature (around 70 °F). 
In models with no heater, there are at least several inches of insulation above the water chamber. This partially eliminates the body-contouring benefit of a waterbed, and the ability to control the bed temperature. For these reasons, most waterbeds have temperature control systems. Temperature is controlled via a thermostat and set to personal preference, most commonly around average skin temperature, . A typical heating pad consumes 150–400 watts of power. Depending on insulation, bedding, temperature, use, and other factors, electricity usage may vary significantly.

Waterbeds are usually constructed from soft polyvinyl chloride (PVC) or similar material. They can be repaired with practically any vinyl repair kit.

Types of waterbed mattresses 
Free flow mattress: Also known as a full wave mattress. It contains only water but no baffles or inserts.
 Semi-waveless mattress: Contains a few fiber inserts and/or baffles to control the water motion and increase support.
 Waveless mattress: Contains many layers of fiber inserts and/or baffles to control the water motion and increase support. Frequently, the better mattresses contain additional layers in the center third of the mattress called special lumbar support.

History in 1800s
A form of waterbed was invented in 1833 by the Scottish physician Neil Arnott. Dr. Arnott's Hydrostatic Bed was devised to prevent bedsores in patients, and comprised a bath of water with a covering of rubber-impregnated canvas, on which lighter bedding was placed. Arnott didn't patent it, permitting anyone to construct a bed to this design.

The use of a waterbed (for the ailing Mrs. Hale) is mentioned in Elizabeth Gaskell's 1855 novel North and South.

On May 18, 1863, a proposal for waterbed supplies was posted to newspapers by the USA Medical and Hospital Department, Medical Purveyor's Office, Washington D.C. The proposal requested a supplier for "water-beds, India Rubber Rubber Cushions, for air or water".

In 1871, a waterbed was in use in Elmira, New York, for "invalids". It was briefly mentioned by Mark Twain in his article "A New Beecher Church", which was published in The New York Times on 23 July 1871. Twain wrote: "In the infirmary will be kept one or two water-beds (for invalids whose pains will not allow them to be on a less yielding substance) and half a dozen reclining invalid-chairs on wheels. The water-beds and invalid-chairs at present belonging to the church are always in demand, and never out of service".

A newspaper classified want ad in 1877 requested "AN INDIA RUBBER Water-bed. 3 feet by 2 feet, new or second hand. Call immediately at 1,222 Broadway."

The protagonist Graham is placed on a waterbed in a glass case during his coma of 203 years in the 1898 H. G. Wells novel "The Sleeper Awakes".

Heinlein descriptions
Science fiction writer Robert A. Heinlein described therapeutic waterbeds in his novels Beyond This Horizon (1942), Double Star (1956), and Stranger in a Strange Land (1961). In 1980 Heinlein recalled in Expanded Universe:

Heinlein made no attempt to build his invention, but its first builder, Charles Hall, was denied a patent claim based on Heinlein's "prior works".

Apparently, the initial patent application by Charles Hall for the waterbed was denied as being too broad, as the device itself had been described by Heinlein in several of his novels that had been published more than 25 years prior to Hall trying to make one. Hall was later granted a patent when he modified and specified his design.

The Hall waterbed
The modern waterbed was created by Charles Prior Hall in 1968, while he was a design student at San Francisco State University in California. Hall originally wanted to make an innovative chair. His first prototype was a vinyl bag with 300 pounds (136 kg) of cornstarch. Ultimately, he abandoned working on a chair, and settled on perfecting a bed.

Hall was granted a patent (#3,585,356) on his waterbed in 1971, which he originally called "liquid support for human bodies." The same year, he founded Innerspace Environments, a manufacturing and sales company which became the leading retailer of waterbeds in the United States, with 30 owned-and-operated stores. The patent came to trial in 1991 in Intex v. Hall /wbx. The patent was upheld in court, and Hall received a $4.8 million judgment for infringement. Hall /wbx received additional royalties from licensing. Some later lawsuits were dismissed because of laches.

In 1987, sales peaked at 22% of the domestic mattress industry. Although the waterbed was initially advertised as offering "undisturbed sleep", Hall admitted that customers "bought it for the sensual or the sexual part of it", and the sexually associated advertising was highly effective in the 1970s and early 1980s. Henry Petroski of Duke University said of the waterbed: "Not only was it the cool new gadget, but it emerged during a time when the culture embraced anything different, especially a product that embodied sexual liberation".

Advantages and disadvantages

Regarding usage
The waterbed can be useful and comfortable for some and dangerous for others. The main feature of the waterbed found attractive is its form-fitting, pressure-minimizing nature. Not only is this beneficial to those seeking mere comfort, but the removal of pressure from the spine can provide relief to those with back pain. In addition, the distribution of weight can prevent bedsores among the paralytic and the comatose. However, the National Institute of Child Health and Human Development warns that the form-fitting nature of the water-bed poses a danger to infants, providing a possibility of asphyxiation.

Another advantage of a waterbed is its easy cleaning. It is impossible for dirt and dead skin particles to penetrate the water mattress, which can then be wiped away periodically with a cloth and vinyl cleaner. The cover over the mattress can be regularly washed—thus virtually eliminating house dust mites in the bed. Dust mites can trigger asthma, eczema, and allergies in people sensitive to them.

Other factors
First, since some hard-sided waterbeds are of different sizes from other mattresses, bed sheets are harder to find and come in fewer varieties. Second, moving a waterbed is more difficult than moving a normal bed; the water must be drained and the frame disassembled, then the frame must be reassembled, the mattress refilled with water, and the water heated for a potentially long period to get the new water to the correct temperature. Heating the bed can be costly; a waterbed consumes between 300 and 1,500 kWh/year ($36–180 USD at 12c/kWh, the US national average cost for residential energy), depending on the climate, bed size, and other factors. The energy usage can be decreased by about 60% with the use of a soft-sided waterbed. The ability to heat the bed is lost if there is a power outage, and this can make the bed too cold to sleep on, particularly if the power outage occurs during winter, and/or the room cannot be heated. The water itself can pose challenges when water mattresses occasionally leak. Plastic liners will reduce damage, but emptying, patching, refilling, and reheating the bed (and sleeping elsewhere until all this is completed) can be an inconvenience. Another factor is the weight of a waterbed. This weight could pose a risk to the floor the bed is on. Some landlords may not allow a tenant to have a waterbed due to this, especially if it is on a higher floor.

See also
 List of inflatable manufactured goods

References

External links

 —"Liquid support for human bodies"
 "Make your bed and float on it: $100 waterbed you build from a kit", Popular Science, July 1971, pages 75, 116
 "The Rise and Fall of the (Sexy, Icky, Practical) Waterbed", The Atlantic
 "Someone's Been Lying in Hall's Water Bed: Invention", Los Angeles Times
 "Making Waves", SF State Magazine, Fall/Winter 2013
 "THE RIP VAN WINKLE OF THE WATER BED", The Washington Post

1970s fads and trends
Beds
Bedding
History of the San Francisco Bay Area
Water and society